Seires (Greek: Σειρές, before 1928: Βερσίτσι - Versitsi) is a mountain village and a community in the municipal unit of Aroania, Achaea, Greece. It was named after the ancient town Seirae, that was part of Arcadian Azania. In 2011, it had a population of 76 for the village and 263 for the community, which includes the villages Agioi Theodoroi, Agios Georgios, Krini and Thomaiika.  Seires is situated at 940 m above sea level. Seires is 3 km west of Alestaina, 4 km northwest of Paos, 5 km east of Psofida and 23 km southwest of Kalavryta.

Population

History

According to Pausanias, Seirae was an Arcadian city at the border between Cleitor and Psophis. The city was located near the Soron Forest and near the ruined settlement of Paos. Seires was an independent community until 1997, when it joined the newly formed municipality of Aroania.

See also

List of settlements in Achaea

References

External links
Seires at the GTP Travel Pages

Arcadian city-states
Arcadian Azania
Aroania
Populated places in Achaea